Uşak railway station is a railway station in Uşak, Turkey and is the only station within the city. TCDD Taşımacılık operates a daily inter-city train from İzmir to Konya and a daily regional train to İzmir.

The station was originally built by the Smyrna Cassaba Railway in 1887 as part of their railway from Smyrna (modern-day İzmir) to Karahisar. Uşak station consists of a single side platform, serving one track. The four other tracks are used for storing passenger cars during layovers as well as freight cars.

References

Railway stations in Uşak Province
Railway stations opened in 1887
Buildings and structures in Uşak Province
Transport in Uşak Province